This is a list of long place names.

Single-word names

25 letters or more

{|class="wikitable"
!Name!!No.!!Location!!Language!!Translation
|-
|Azpilicuetagaraycosaroyarenberecolarrea||39|| Place in Azpilkueta, Navarra, Spain|| Basque|| “The low field of a high pen of Azpilkueta”. Notes: The longest official one-word place name in Spain and the second-longest in Europe.
|-
|Äteritsiputeritsipuolilautatsijänkä||35|| Bog region in Lapland, Finland||Finnish(northern dialect)||Unknown etymology, probably gibberish (see entry for more).Notes: The longest official one-word place name in Finland, the third-longest (including names with spaces or hyphens) in Europe and since 2020 the longest official place name in European Union (before Brexit this record was held by Llanfairpwllgwyngyllgogerychwyrndrobwllllantysiliogogogoch).
|-
|Pekwachnamaykoskwaskwaypinwanik||31||Lake in Manitoba, Canada||Cree||"Where the wild trout are caught by fishing with hooks".Note: The longest official one-word placename in Canada.
|-
|Andorijidoridaraemihansumbau||28||Street in Bukpyeong-myeon, Jeongseon County, Gangwon Province, South Korea||Korean||Hangul: 안돌이지돌이다래미한숨바우"A road so rocky and rough that even squirrels can't breathe enough."
|-
|Venkatanarasimharajuvaripeta||28||Village in Andhra Pradesh, India||Telugu||Telugu: వెంకటనరసింహరాజువారిపేట
"Venkatanarasimharaju's city".Note: The longest one-word placename in India.
|-
|Bovenendvankeelafsnysleegte||27||Farm in the Upper Karoo in South Africa||Afrikaans||"Upper end of throat-cut valley" ("hollow" may be more accurate than "valley").
|-
|Mamungkukumpurangkuntjunya||26||A hill in South Australia, Australia||Pitjantjatjara||"Where the devil urinates".Note: The longest official one-word placename in Australia.
|-
| Schmedeswurtherwesterdeich||26|| A hamlet outside the village of Schmedeswurth, Schleswig-Holstein, Germany||German||"West levee of the smith's hill-village".
|-
|Wereldtentoonstellingslaan||26||Avenue in Ganshoren, Brussels, Belgium||Dutch||"World Fair Avenue"Named after Brussels World Fair of 1958.
|-
|Haaldersbroekerdwarsstraat||26||Street in Zaandam, Netherlands||Dutch||"Cross street in Haalderbroek".
|-
|Bullaunancheathrairaluinn||25||Bullaun in County Galway, Ireland||Anglicisation of Irish||Irish: Ballán an Cheathrair Álainn."Bullaun of the Four Beauties".Believed to be the longest official one-word Irish-derived placename in Ireland.
|-
|Noordhollandschkanaaldijk||25||Dike in Amsterdam, Netherlands||Dutch||"North Holland canal dike".
|-
|Blindeliedengasthuissteeg||25||Alley in Dordrecht, Netherlands||Dutch||"Blind craftsmen guesthouse alley".
|-
|Reijmerstokkerdorpsstra'||25||Street in Reijmerstok, Netherlands||Dutch||"Reijmerstok town road".
|-
|Gasselterboerveenschemond||25||Hamlet in Drenthe, Netherlands||Dutch||"Delta of Gasselt's (surname) farmer's bog".Note: The longest official one-word place name in the Netherlands.
|}

20-24 letters

14–19 letters

Names with spaces or hyphens

 Krungthepmahanakhon Amonrattanakosin Mahintharayutthaya Mahadilokphop Noppharatratchathaniburirom Udomratchaniwetmahasathan Amonphimanawatansathit Sakkathattiyawitsanukamprasit' (176 letters) Full name of Bangkok, Thailand
 in Thai: กรุงเทพมหานคร อมรรัตนโกสินทร์ มหินทรายุธยา มหาดิลกภพ นพรัตนราชธานีบูรีรมย์ อุดมราชนิเวศน์มหาสถาน อมรพิมานอวตารสถิต สักกะทัตติยวิษณุกรรมประสิทธิ์ (132 letters + 7 spaces)
 Some long Thai place names are also:
 Khlong Nakhon Nueang Khet, Mueang Chachoengsao District, Chachoengsao province
 Khlong Udom Chonlachon, Mueang Chachoengsao District, Chachoengsao Province
 Nikhom Sang Ton-eng Lam Dom Noi, Sirindhorn District, Ubon Ratchathani Province
 Pak Khlong Phasi Charoen, Phasi Charoen District, Bangkok
 Pak Phanang Fang Tawan Tok (Western Pak Phanang), Pak Phanang District, Nakhon Si Thammarat Province
 Pak Phanang Fang Tawan Ok (Eastern Pak Phanang), Pak Phanang District, Nakhon Si Thammarat Province
 Phra Borom Maha Ratchawang, Phra Nakhon District, Bangkok
 Phra Nakhon Si Ayutthaya Province/District/City
 Thung Kratat Phatthana, Nong Ki District, Buriram Province
 Puratchi Thalaivar Dr. M.G. Ramachandran Central Railway Station, longest place name in India.
 Some countries that have long names with spaces are:
 Saint Kitts and Nevis, a small island country in the Caribbean.
 Saint Vincent and the Grenadines, an island country in the Caribbean.
 Papua New Guinea, an island country bordering Indonesia.
 Central African Republic, a country in Africa.
 Democratic Republic of the Congo, a country in Africa.
 United Arab Emirates, a country in the Middle East.
 São Tomé and Príncipe, a country in Africa in the western coast near Gabon.
 Republic of the Congo, a country in Africa.
 Antigua and Barbuda, a country in the Caribbean.
 Bosnia and Herzegovina, a country in Europe and former Yugoslav republic.
 Trinidad and Tobago, an island country in North America.
 Longest place names in Canada: 
 Local service district of Lethbridge, Morley's Siding, Brooklyn, Charleston, Jamestown, Portland, Winter Brook and Sweet Bay (80 letters, 87 non-space characters), Newfoundland and Labrador
 United Townships of Dysart, Dudley, Harcourt, Guilford, Harburn, Bruton, Havelock, Eyre and Clyde (61 letters, 68 non-space characters), usually shortened to Dysart, et al., Ontario
 Uruguay: Muy Fiel y Reconquistadora Ciudad de San Felipe y Santiago de Montevideo (60 letters)
 United Kingdom: The United Kingdom of Great Britain and Northern Ireland (48 letters, longest official name of a country)
 United States: Commonwealth of Massachusetts (27 letters)
 Argentina: Real de Nuestra Señora Santa María del Buen Ayre, Buenos Aires (40 letters)
 England: The Royal Town of Sutton Coldfield (29 letters)
 Venezuela: Santiago de León de Caracas (23 letters)
 Sri Lanka: Sri Jayawardenepura Kotte (23 letters)
 Some long U.S. place names appearing in the Geographic Names Information System are:
 Winchester-on-the-Severn, Maryland, and Washington-on-the-Brazos, Texas (21 letters, longest hyphenated place names in the U.S.) 
 Rancho Santa Margarita, California
 Oxon Hill-Glassmanor, Maryland
 Dalworthington Gardens, Texas
 Little Harbor on the Hillsboro, Florida
 Pops Hammock Seminole Village, Florida
 Friendly Village of Crooked Creek, Georgia
 Manchester-by-the-Sea, Massachusetts
 Howey-in-the-Hills, Florida
The Village of Lakewood, Illinois
 Little Diamond Island Landing, Maine
 Los Ranchos de Albuquerque, New Mexico
 Orchard Point at Piney Orchard, Maryland
 Point Field Landing on the Severn, Maryland
Riverside Village of Church Creek, Maryland
 Monmouth Heights at Manalapan, New Jersey
 Staffordville Public Landing, New Jersey
 Holly View Forest-Highland Park, North Carolina
 The Village of Indian Hill, Ohio
 Washington Court House
 Slovenska Narodna Podporna Jednota, Pennsylvania
 The Landing at Plantation Point, South Carolina
 Kinney and Gourlays Improved City Plat, Utah
 Little Cottonwood Creek Valley, Utah
 Marine on St. Croix, Minnesota
 South Chicago Heights, Illinois
 Grand View-on-Hudson, New York
 Lake Norman of Catawba, North Carolina
 The original name of Los Angeles, California, in 1781, was "El Pueblo de Nuestra Señora la Reina de los Ángeles del Río de Porciúncula"; in English this means "The Town of Our Lady the Queen of Angels of the Porciúncula River".
 The longest hyphenated name in England is the 29-letter-long name Sutton-under-Whitestonecliffe, the name of a tiny village in North Yorkshire.
 The longest names for communes in France are Saint-Remy-en-Bouzemont-Saint-Genest-et-Isson, Marne (45 characters including hyphens), Saint-Germain-de-Tallevende-la-Lande-Vaumont, Calvados (44 characters), and Beaujeu-Saint-Vallier-Pierrejux-et-Quitteur, Haute-Saône (43 characters).
 The longest department name in France is Alpes-de-Haute-Provence (23 characters, including hyphens).
 The longest place name in Austria is Pfaffenschlag bei Waidhofen an der Thaya (40 characters).
The longest street name in Hungary is Ferihegyi repülőtérre vezető út. It means "Road leading to the airport at Ferihegy" (28 characters)
 The longest place name in Spain is Colinas del Campo de Martín Moro Toledano de Castilla y León, in the province of León (50 characters).
 The longest place name in Finland is Semmonen niemi, jossa käärme koiraa pisti, in the municipality of Perho (36 characters, including a comma). The English translation is That cape where a snake bit the dog.
 The longest municipality name in the Czech Republic is the name of Nová Ves u Nového Města na Moravě (33 characters, English translation: "New Village in near of New Town in Moravia).
 The longest single place name in Germany is Hellschen-Heringsand-Unterschaar in Schleswig-Holstein (32 characters). In the standard official naming scheme, however, villages are disambiguated by prefixing them with the name of the municipality they are part of. The longest official place name is therefore Michelbach an der Bilz-Gschlachtenbretzingen (40 characters).
 The longest place names in Italy are Pino sulla Sponda del Lago Maggiore and San Valentino in Abruzzo Citeriore, with 30 letters, or it is Cortaccia sulla Strada del Vino - Kurtatsch an der Weinstraße considering the official name both in Italian and German.
 The longest place names in Poland are Sobienie Kiełczewskie Pierwsze and Przedmieście Szczebrzeszyńskie, with 30 letters (including spaces).
 The longest place name in the Netherlands is Westerhaar-Vriezenveensewijk (28 characters, including a hyphen). The longest street name is  Laan van de landinrichtingscommissie Duiven-Westervoort in Duiven.
 The longest place name in Malaysia is Kampung Simpang Tiga Durian Chondong, with 36 characters (including spaces).
 The municipality with the longest name in Brazil is Vila Bela da Santíssima Trindade, with 32 characters (including spaces).
  The municipality with the longest name in Mexico is Dolores Hidalgo Cuna de la Independencia Nacional (49 characters).
 The longest place name in Mexico is San Pedro y San Pablo Tequixtepec (28 letters).
 The longest city name in Argentina is San Fernando del Valle de Catamarca (30 letters).
 Truth or Consequences is a spa city and the county seat of Sierra County, New Mexico, United States.
 Bellefontaine Neighbors, Missouri (22 letters) has the longest name of any incorporated place in the United States.
 The longest name of a settlement in Russia with spaces (not counting official names of municipalities) is (in ISO 9) "posyolok Central'noj usad'by` sovxoza imeni 40-letiya Velikogo Oktyabrya" (50 letters (if not counting the word posyolok/посёлок, which is a generic name for a settlement), and 2 digits, which would give another 6 letters). The English translation is a settlement of The Central Farmstead of the Sovkhoz named after the 40-years Anniversary of the Great October.
 The longest hyphenated name of a settlement in Belgium is Chaussée-Notre-Dame-Louvignies (27 letters).
 The longest hyphenated name of a settlement in Russia is Kremenchug-Konstantinovskoye (Кременчуг-Константиновское, 25 letters). The English translation is (new) Kremenchug named after Konstantin (a first settler).
Putevaya Usadba 9 km zheleznoy dorogi Luostari–Nikel (Russian:Путевая Усадьба 9 км железной дороги Луостари–Никель) is a rural locality in Murmansk Oblast, Russia. It is located within the Arctic Circle. In English, the name translates to Track Homestead 9 km of Luostari-Nikel railway The longest name of a settlement in Croatia is Gornje Mrzlo Polje Mrežničko (25 letters). The English translation is Upper cold field near Mrežnica''.
 The longest municipality name in the Philippines is General Salipada K. Pendatun (24 characters), named after the Mindanaoan general and senator of the same name.

See also
Longest word in English
List of longest placenames in Ireland
List of short place names

References

Names
Lists of place names